Monarchy is the second studio album by Pennsylvania death metal band Rivers of Nihil. The album was released on August 21, 2015 via Metal Blade Records. It is the second album in the band's tetralogy based around the four seasons; it represents summer.

Background and promotion
Rivers of Nihil returned to Atrium studios to work again with Slovak on their second full-length studio album, Monarchy, which was released on August 21, 2015. The album sold 1,175 copies in its first week. On August 17, 2015, the band made Monarchy available for streaming in full.

Album artwork was created by Dan Seagrave, who would handle the artwork on the band's other two albums as well. Dan Seagrave explained, "This image continues the theme from the previous record. The season is now based around summer. In the text of the narrative we have shifted significantly forward in time, many thousands of years. The image depicts roughly the same location as the last album. The middle eroded tower holds on the top left, the steps which had led up to the life form 'pod'. A very small detail. In the background are the now heavily eroded, and sand covered structures seen in that last artwork. The small statues dotted around depict the new life form that had succeeded us."

In promotion of the album, the band released three singles, some of which have their own videos: "Perpetual Growth Machine", the title track, and "Sand Baptism".

Track listing

Personnel 
Production and performance credits are adapted from the album liner notes.

Rivers of Nihil
 Jake Dieffenbach – lead vocals
 Brody Uttley – lead guitar
 Adam Biggs – bass, backing vocals
 Jon Topore – rhythm guitar
 Alan Balamut – drums

Production
 Dan Seagrave – artwork
 Brody Uttley – additional engineering
 Alan Douches – mastering
 Carson Slovak, Grant McFarland – production, engineering, mixing

References

2015 albums
Metal Blade Records albums
Rivers of Nihil albums